The Strengthen the Arm of Liberty Monument is a replica of the Statue of Liberty (Liberty Enlightening the World) in Pine Bluff Memorial Gardens, on the south side of 10th Avenue between Georgia and State Street in Pine Bluff, Arkansas. It was placed by the Boy Scouts of America (BSA) as part of its 1950s era campaign, "Strengthen the Arm of Liberty." The statue faces north, toward the Pine Bluff Civic Center, and there is a bronze commemorative plaque on the north face of the base. It is one of two BSA-placed statues in the state; the other is in Fayetteville.

The statue was listed on the National Register of Historic Places in 2000.

See also
National Register of Historic Places listings in Jefferson County, Arkansas
Replicas of the Statue of Liberty
Scouting memorials
Scouting museums

References

External links

Replica Statue of Liberty Search

1950 sculptures
Monuments and memorials on the National Register of Historic Places in Arkansas
National Register of Historic Places in Pine Bluff, Arkansas
Outdoor sculptures in Arkansas
Sculptures of women in Arkansas
Pine Bluff, Arkansas
Statues in Arkansas
1950 establishments in Arkansas